The 1959 World Modern Pentathlon Championships were held in Hershey, United States.

Medal summary

Men's events

Medal table

See also
 World Modern Pentathlon Championships

References

 Sport123

World Modern Pentathlon Championships, 1959
Modern pentathlon in North America
World Modern Pentathlon Championships, 1959
International sports competitions hosted by the United States
Hershey, Pennsylvania
Sports competitions in Pennsylvania
Multisports in the United States